is a puzzle game by the Japanese developer Compile. The game was released in 2001 for the Game Boy Advance handheld game system. "Guru Logi" is an abbreviation of "Guruguru Logic", "guruguru" (ぐるぐる) being a Japanese onomatopoeia for a rotating motion.

The game's story mode sees the Champs, small yellow bird-like creatures who attempt to help the inhabitants of their neighbourhood out of various troubles. To do so, they must complete a series of logic puzzles. There are a total of 335 puzzles in the game, and if they are all completed a totally different mini-game is unlocked.

Each stage requires the player to complete an image by placing and removing blocks on the board. The puzzles are set up so that there is no simple solution; often the player is blocked by other immovable areas and so must improvise a solution by constantly constructing and deconstructing their own barriers. The board itself may be rotated so that the player can construct the solution from all four sides.  An additional Battle Mode exists in which two players must race to finish puzzles in the fastest time. Battle mode requires a Game Link Cable and only one game pak cartridge.

The game itself is best compared to Picross and Magical Drop. Similar to Picross, a board consisting of a set of blocks creates an image. Similar to Magical Drop, gameplay involves throwing blocks vertically into the play area and sucking them back off again.

There are a number of unofficial remakes of the game:
 A port to the MSX2 is currently under development by TNI.
 An English 80-level remake available for the PC. This is still a work in progress and has no sound.
 There are also completed freeware remakes for the GP2X Wiz and GPH Caanoo by the same programmer (Ian Price) as the PC remake 

According to late-2001 GameSpot ads, the game was scheduled to be released in the United States on December 22, 2001, but this was scrapped due to a poor Japanese-to-English translation. In various screenshots of a Beta for the English-language "Guru Logic Champ" (the official North American title), many language errors are present.

Snapdots 

A reworking of the game concept was released by D4 Enterprise for DSiWare under the name , known as Snapdots outside Japan. It was released on December 2, 2009 in Japan and October 18, 2010 in North America.

New to Snapdots is the presence of a human-like alien character named Dotty, who acts as your guide during the tutorial and provides commentary on each puzzle that you solve. In addition, the game now displays the number of moves it took you to solve each puzzle along with the time, and it also features a Time Attack mode in which players are tasked with solving as many puzzles as they can, chosen randomly, in a specific time frame. The basic rules and gameplay mechanics remain unchanged from Guru Logi Champ, however, and many of the puzzles in Snapdots were identical to puzzles found in the previous game.

Clones 
PopCap released a web game called Pixelus (and the downloadable version Pixelus Deluxe) that featured the same gameplay mechanics as Guru Logi Champ, but dressed up in an Ancient Roman graphical theme.

References

External links
Mirror of the now defunct Official Guru Logi Champ web site

2001 video games
2009 video games
2010 video games
Compile (company) games
Puzzle video games
Nintendo games
Nintendo DS games
Nintendo DS-only games
Game Boy Advance games
Game Boy Advance-only games
Fictional birds
Video games developed in Japan